Nachiketa is an Indian masculine given name. It is most well-known through the character of the same name in the ancient Katha Upanishad.

Notable people with the name include: 
 Kambampati Nachiketa (born 1973), Indian Air Force Pilot
 Nachiketa Ghosh (1925–1976), Indian music director and composer
 Nachiketa Sharma, musician
 Nachiketa Chakraborty, musician

Indian given names
Sanskrit-language names